Anne Elizabeth "Annabeth" Gish (born March 13, 1971) is an American actress. She has played roles in films Shag, Hiding Out, Mystic Pizza, SLC Punk!, The Last Supper and Double Jeopardy. On television, she played Special Agent Monica Reyes on The X-Files, Elizabeth Bartlet Westin on The West Wing, Diane Gould on Halt and Catch Fire, Eileen Caffee on Brotherhood, Charlotte Millwright on The Bridge and Sheriff Althea Jarry on the seventh and final season of Sons of Anarchy.

Early life and education
Gish was born in Albuquerque, New Mexico, the daughter of Judy and Robert Gish. When she was two, her family moved to Cedar Falls, Iowa, where she grew up with her brother Tim and her sister Robin. Her father was an English professor at the University of Northern Iowa; her mother was an elementary school teacher.

Gish went to Northern University High School in Cedar Falls, Iowa, where she graduated in 1989. She attended Duke University, where she was a member of the Kappa Kappa Gamma sorority and focused her energies on the Drama program, Film Studies and Women's Studies. She received a B.A. in English in July 1993.

Career
Gish's first starring role was in the 1986 teen film Desert Bloom. In 1987, she starred in the film Hiding Out with Jon Cryer. She played Kat, the sister of Julia Roberts' character, in 1988's Mystic Pizza. In 1989, Gish's first major TV film role was in When He's Not a Stranger as rape victim Lyn McKenna. Gish portrayed Anne Hampton, the doomed second wife of Rhett Butler, in 1994 in the TV mini series Scarlett. She starred in the 1989 comedy, Shag, starring Bridget Fonda, Phoebe Cates, Page Hannah, Jeff Yagher and Scott Coffey.

In 1994's Wyatt Earp, starring Kevin Costner, she played Urilla Sutherland, Wyatt's childhood sweetheart and eventual wife. The next year, she appeared in Oliver Stone's Nixon as Julie Nixon. In 1996, Gish played the girlfriend Tracey in Beautiful Girls. In 1997, Gish received her first starring role in a movie, portraying Susan Sparks opposite Shaquille O'Neal in the movie adaptation of DC Comics superhero Steel. In 1997, she starred in the TV movie True Women as Euphemia Ashby alongside Dana Delany and Angelina Jolie. In 1998, Gish starred in SLC Punk! as a head shop owner named Trish.

In 2001, Gish joined the cast of The X-Files as Special Agent Monica Reyes after series star David Duchovny announced his intention to leave the show. During the eighth and ninth seasons, Gish and fellow newcomer Robert Patrick became the show's principal characters and it was presumed that the two could carry on the show even after Gillian Anderson left. While it is generally agreed their performances were good, ratings continued to drop with the departure of Duchovny and his dynamic partnership with Gillian Anderson; the ninth season of The X-Files became the show's last until 2016.

She guest-starred on The West Wing playing Elizabeth Bartlet Westin, eldest daughter of President Josiah Bartlet (Martin Sheen), first appearing in 2003. In 2006, Gish played the role of Julia in the independent movie The Celestine Prophecy and costarred in Candles on Bay Street alongside Eion Bailey and Alicia Silverstone. The same year she landed a lead role in the Showtime drama Brotherhood as Eileen Caffee, and appeared in 29 of the 33 episodes in the series's three-season run.

Gish played Jo Noonan in the A&E TV miniseries Stephen King's Bag of Bones in 2011. Also in 2011, she played the role of Anne Sullivan, a mysterious therapist in Pretty Little Liars. In 2012, she made a guest appearance in 12th season of the CBS crime drama CSI: Crime Scene Investigation. The same year she co-starred on the ABC drama pilot Americana as the mother of Ashley Greene's character. However, the pilot was not picked up.

From 2013 to 2014, Gish was part of the main cast in the FX series The Bridge, in which she played Charlotte Millwright, a widow who discovers that her recently deceased husband had secrets on both sides of the US-Mexican border. She had a guest-starring role on Sons of Anarchy as Lt. Althea Jarry of the San Joaquin County Sheriff's Department, in 2014. The following summer, it was announced Gish would return as Monica Reyes in the upcoming The X Files revival, appearing in episode 6 of season 10, and reprising her role in the eleventh season. She co-starred with Kate Bosworth, Thomas Jane and Dash Mihok in the 2016 thriller film Before I Wake.

Gish appeared as drug lord Alice Sands in three episodes of the TNT Rizzoli & Isles series, in 2016. Two years later she had a recurring role as the caretaker Mrs. Dudley in the Netflix series The Haunting of Hill House, based loosely off of Shirley Jackson's novel of the same name. In 2021 she again teamed up with Mike Flanagan in the Netflix horror series, “Midnight Mass”.

Humanitarian efforts
Gish is a supporter of CARE International and, more recently, of Students Rebuild and One Million Bones. On behalf of these organizations, she filmed a short public service announcement video in April 2012. She is on the board of non-profit organization The Unusual Suspects Theatre Company.

Personal life
Despite persistent reports, Gish is not related to the early silent film actress sisters Lillian and Dorothy Gish. When Gish first became interested in acting, she wrote a letter to Lillian Gish, who replied by encouraging Annabeth to stay away from the business. Lillian wrote, "There's too much talent and not enough work in the movies!"

Gish started dating The X-Files stunt man Wade Allen in December 2001. They married in October 2003 and have two children.

Filmography

Film

Television

References

External links
 

1971 births
Living people
20th-century American actresses
21st-century American actresses
Actresses from Albuquerque, New Mexico
Actresses from Iowa
Actresses from New Mexico
American child actresses
American film actresses
American television actresses
Duke University Trinity College of Arts and Sciences alumni
People from Cedar Falls, Iowa